Vangen Church is the main parish church in Aurland Municipality in Vestland county, Norway. It is located in the village of Aurlandsvangen, at the end of the Aurlandsfjorden. It is the church for the Vangen parish which is part of the Sogn prosti (deanery) in the Diocese of Bjørgvin. The white, stone church was built in a long church design and in early Gothic style around the year 1202. The church seats about 270 people.

Vangen Church is the largest of the seven medieval stone churches in the Sogn og Fjordane region, leading it to be called the Sognedomen or Sogn Cathedral.

History
The church probably built in two stages in the 13th century which the chancel built first and the nave built slightly later. There is a foundation stone in the church on which the date 2 May 1202 is inscribed, and a letter (now lost) that was once found in the church stated that the church was consecrated on 2 May 1202. A local historian, Anders Ohnstad, has stated that King Sverre had local ties to Aurland and he died in March 1202, so the church may have been constructed on his orders.

It does not have a sacristy, porch, or tower. The church has a hexagonal pulpit from the early 17th century. It is decorated with painted tulips, brass ornaments, and pilasters in green, yellow and red against a pale yellow background.

In 1814, this church served as an election church. Together with more than 300 other parish churches across Norway, it was a polling station for elections to the 1814 Norwegian Constituent Assembly which wrote the Constitution of Norway. This was Norway's first national elections. Each church parish was a constituency that elected people called "electors" who later met together in each county to elect the representatives for the assembly that was to meet in Eidsvoll later that year.

The church was restored both in 1861-1862. In 1926, the church was restored again, this time the old wooden church porch was removed to bring it back to its historic exterior design.

Media gallery

See also
 List of churches in Bjørgvin

References

Aurland
Churches in Vestland
Long churches in Norway
Stone churches in Norway
13th-century churches in Norway
13th-century establishments in Norway
Norwegian election church